Shake It Up  is a Chinese reality dance series produced by Dragon Television. The show officially aired and broadcast online on July 22, 2018 on Dragon Television.

Concept
Shake It Up brings celebrities together in China and Taiwan to compete.

Contestants

References

External links

Chinese music television series
Chinese television shows
Mandarin-language television shows
2018 Chinese television series debuts
2018 Chinese television series endings